Disney's All-Star Sports Resort is a resort that is part of the Walt Disney World Resort. It is one of five Resorts in the Value Resort category, along with Disney's All-Star Music Resort, Disney's All-Star Movies Resort, Disney's Pop Century Resort, and Disney's Art of Animation Resort. All three All-Star Resorts are located on the southern portion of the Walt Disney World property (the only portion that is located in Osceola County; the rest of Walt Disney World is located in Orange County) and has a sports theme. As is characteristic of all Disney Value resorts, the property is decorated with giant novelty items, such as SurfBoard Bay, the baseball-themed Grand Slam Pool and a football field, and a giant football helmet.

As with the other All-Star Resorts, the Miami company Arquitectonica designed the resort.

References

External links
 

 Hotel buildings completed in 1994
All-Star Sports Resort
 Hotels established in 1994
1994 establishments in Florida